Cai Rukai (1867 - 1923) was a Chinese politician and educator of the late Qing dynasty and early Republican period.

Biography
Cai was born in Nanchang, Jiangxi in 1867. During the reign of Guangxu Emperor in the Qing dynasty, he successfully achieved the rank of Juren on the imperial examination.

In January 1906 he became supervisor of Imperial Peiyang University, and served until December 1911. In 1912, after the establishment of the Republic of China, he became director of Zhili Education Bureau, a position at provincial level. Under the Beiyang government, he served as President of National Peiyang University between February 1913 and March 1914, and then he rose to become Minister of Education. In December 1915, after Yuan Shikai's accession to the throne, Yuan conferred the title of "Barons of the First Rank" to him. In 1921 he was appointed general manager of Nanchang–Jiujiang railway, serving in the post until he died in 1923.

Personal life
Cai has a daughter, Cai Baozhen, who once served as president of Beijing Children's Library, she was married to Ying Qianli (1900–1969), a prominent Catholic layman and educator.

References

Additional sources 
 
 
 

1867 births
1923 deaths
Educators from Jiangxi
Republic of China politicians from Jiangxi
Qing dynasty politicians from Jiangxi
Politicians from Nanchang
Empire of China (1915–1916)
Presidents of universities and colleges in China